This is a list of Hong Kong football transfers for the 2008 summer transfer window. Only transfers involving First Division clubs in the 2008–09 season are listed.

Transfers

Citizen

In:

Out:

Convoy Sun Hei

In:

Out:

Eastern

In:

Out:

Fourway

In:

Out:

Happy Valley

In:

Out:

Kitchee

In:

Out:

Mutual

In:

Out:

NT Realty Wofoo Tai Po (Wofoo Tai Po)

In:

Out:

South China

In:

Out:

TSW Pegasus

In:

Out:

Tuen Mun Progoal (Workable)

In:

Out:

Notes and references

Hong Kong
Transfers Summer 2008
2008